Koons is a surname. People with that name include:

People
 Benjamin F. Koons (1844–1903), American academic administrator
 Jeff Koons (born 1955), American artist
 Darell Koons (1924–2016), American painter
 Harry Koons (1862–1932), American baseball player
 Robert C. Koons, American philosopher

See also
 Rogers v. Koons, a leading U.S. court case on copyright, dealing with the fair use defense for parody
 Koons Buick, Inc. v. Nigh, a U.S. court case about personal-property loans

See also
 Coons (disambiguation)
 Koon (disambiguation)
 Koontz (disambiguation)